Decimate the Weak is the debut studio album by American deathcore band Winds of Plague. Released February 5, 2008, the album is the first by Winds of Plague to be released through major label Century Media, and is the last to include drummer Jeff Tenney and keyboardist Matt Feinman. A music video for "The Impaler" was released.

Promotion and release
The album features the songs "A Cold Day in Hell", "Anthems of Apocalypse", "Legions" and "One Body Too Many", all of which were originally available on their debut album, A Cold Day in Hell, but were re-recorded for Decimate the Weak.

Commercial performance
Decimate the Weak peaked at No. 9 on the Billboard Top Heatseekers chart and sold more than 3,600 copies its first week.

Track listing

Personnel
Winds of Plague
 Jonathan "Johnny Plague" Cooke-Hayden – vocals
 Nick Eash – lead guitar
 Nick Piunno – rhythm guitar
 Andrew Glover – bass
 Jeff Tenney – drums, percussion
 Matt Feinman – keyboards

Additional musicians
 Sal Lococo of Sworn Enemy – guest vocals on track 4
 John Cairoli – guest vocals on track 6
 John Mishima – guest vocals on track 7

Additional personnel
 Daniel Castleman – production, engineering, recording
 Tue Madsen – mixing, mastering

References 

2008 debut albums
Winds of Plague albums
Century Media Records albums
Albums with cover art by Pär Olofsson